Birago is both a surname and a given name. Notable people with the name include:

Godwin Antwi Birago (born 1988), Ghanaian-Spanish footballer
Birago Balzano (1936–2022), Italian cartoonist
Birago Diop (1906–1989), Senegalese poet and storyteller